is a Japanese martial artist and actor, best known for his work in Hong Kong action films. He holds dan ranks in Karate (7th degree), Judo (3rd degree), and Aikido (2nd degree).

Biography 
Kurata was born and raised in Sakura-mura, Niihari District, Ibaraki (now part of Tsukuba). Kurata studied performing arts at Nihon University and Toei Theater School. In 1966, Kurata began his career as an actor in Marude Dameo, a Japanese TV series.

In 1971, Kurata made his Hong Kong debut in the Shaw Brothers Studio kung-fu movie Angry Guest (悪客). Since then he has appeared in numerous other films and TV series within the genre. In Japan, he gained popularity for his role in the television series G-Men '75. He is perhaps best known for his extended battle against Jet Li in Fist of Legend and for his villainous role in So Close. He is fluent in Cantonese. He was close friends with Bruce Lee during his career.

In addition to his work as an actor, Kurata runs the stunt agency Kurata Promotion (established 1976 under the name Kurata Action Club), teaches at a private college (the University of Creation, Art, Music & Social Work), is chief advisor to the All Japan Nunchaku League, and in 2004 published a book, . He is running karate dojos in Tokyo, Osaka and Hong Kong.

Filmography

Films

Television

Other

References

External links
 Yasuaki Kurata at All movie.com
 Yasuaki Kurata at animenewsnetwork.com
 

Japanese male actors
1946 births
Living people
People from Ibaraki Prefecture
Japanese aikidoka
Japanese male judoka
Japanese male karateka
Japanese expatriates in Hong Kong
Japanese male film actors
Japanese male television actors
Hong Kong people of Japanese descent
Hong Kong male film actors
Hong Kong male television actors
Shaw Brothers Studio
Nihon University alumni
20th-century Japanese people
21st-century Japanese people